Senator Floyd may refer to:

Charles M. Floyd (1861–1923), New Hampshire
Charles R. Floyd (1881–1945), Texas State Senate
John B. Floyd (West Virginia politician) (1854–1935), West Virginia State Senate
John G. Floyd (1806–1881), New York State Senate
Kay Floyd (fl. 1980s–2010s), Oklahoma State Senate
William Floyd (1734–1821), New York State Senate

See also
Senator Floyd-Jones (disambiguation)